Late Egyptian is the stage of the Egyptian language that was written by the time of the New Kingdom of Egypt around 1350 BC (the Amarna Period). Texts written wholly in Late Egyptian date to the Twentieth Dynasty of Egypt and later. Late Egyptian succeeded but did not fully supplant Middle Egyptian as a literary language.

Late Egyptian literature

Late Egyptian is represented by a large body of religious and secular literature, comprising such examples as the Story of Wenamun, the love poems of the Chester–Beatty I  papyrus, and the Instruction of Any. Instructions became a popular literary genre of the New Kingdom, which took the form of advice on proper behavior. Late Egyptian was also the language of New Kingdom administration.

Differences between Middle and Late Egyptian
Late Egyptian is not completely distinct from Middle Egyptian, as many "classicisms" appear in historical and literary documents of this phase. However, the difference between Middle and Late Egyptian is greater than the difference between Middle and Old Egyptian. Originally a synthetic language, Egyptian by the Late Egyptian phase had become an analytic language. The relationship between Middle Egyptian and Late Egyptian has been described as being similar to that between Latin and Italian. 
 Written Late Egyptian was seemingly a better representative than Middle Egyptian of the spoken language in the New Kingdom and beyond: weak consonants ꜣ, w, j, as well as the feminine ending .t were increasingly dropped, apparently because they stopped being pronounced.
 The demonstrative pronouns  pꜣ (masc.), tꜣ (fem.), and nꜣ (pl.) were used as definite articles. 
 The old form sḏm.n.f (he heard) of the verb was replaced by sḏm-f which had both prospective (he shall hear) and perfective (he heard) aspects. The past tense was also formed using the auxiliary verb jr (make), as in jr.f saḥa.f (he has accused him).
 Adjectives as attributes of nouns are often replaced by nouns.

Developments during the first millennium BC
Hieroglyphic orthography saw an enormous expansion of its graphemic inventory between the Late Period and the Ptolemaic Kingdom. 

Middle Egyptian had a renaissance after the Third Intermediate Period (1070–664 BCE), when it was often used in hieroglyphic and hieratic texts in preference to Late Egyptian.

Grammars
 J. Cerny, S. Israelit-Groll, C. Eyre, A Late Egyptian Grammar, 4th, updated edition – Biblical Institute; Rome, 1984

References

Footnotes

Sources
 Kathryn A. Bard, Encyclopedia of the Archaeology of Ancient Egypt, Routledge 1999, 
 Martin Haspelmath, Language Typology and Language Universals: An International Handbook, Walter de Gruyter 2001, 
 Antonio Loprieno, Ancient Egyptian: A Linguistic Introduction, Cambridge University Press 1995, 
 Anastasios-Phoivos Christidēs, Maria Arapopoulou, Maria Chritē, A History of Ancient Greek: From the Beginnings to Late Antiquity, Cambridge University Press 2007, 
 Eric M. Meyers, The Oxford Encyclopedia of Archaeology in the Near East, 1997

Egyptian languages
Ancient Egyptian language